Kholodny (masculine), Kholodnaya (feminine), or Kholodnoye (neuter) may refer to:
Nikolai Cholodny (Kholodny; 1882–1953), Soviet microbiologist
Vera Kholodnaya (1893–1919), Russian silent movies star
Kholodny (inhabited locality) (Kholodnaya, Kholodnoye), several inhabited localities in Russia
, a river in Tatarstan, Russia; a tributary of Menzelya River

See also
Kolodny, a surname